OneWest Bank, a division of First Citizens BancShares, is a regional bank with over 60 retail branches in Southern California. OneWest Bank specializes in consumer deposit and lending including personal checking and savings accounts, Money Market accounts, CDs, and home loan products. OneWest also offers small business checking, savings, CD and money market accounts as well as small business loans and treasury management products.

History
From 2008 to 2012, 465 banks failed in the United States following the financial crisis of 2007–2008. When the Federal Deposit Insurance Corporation (FDIC) closed the banks, their assets were sold. On March 19, 2009, a seven-member investor group, IMB Holdco, led by Steven Mnuchin—which included billionaire Christopher Flowers, John Paulson, Michael Dell, and George Soros—purchased Independent National Mortgage Corporation (IndyMac Bank) of Pasadena, California for $13.65 billion from the FDIC and created OneWest from the remains of IndyMac, which then had 33 branches and $32 billion in assets. IndyMac Bank's failure was the fourth largest Bank run in the United States.

Through OneWest Bank the investment group purchased two other failed banks from the FDIC, the First Federal Bank of California on December 18, 2009, which then had $6 billion in assets and $5 billion in deposits, and La Jolla Bank, FSB in February 2010, which then represented $3.6 billion in assets. In November 2010, OneWest Bank, purchased a $1.4 billion multifamily and commercial real estate loan portfolio from Citibank, N.A., which included approximately 600 loans, as part of their Commercial Real Estate lending business. Under a Freedom of Information Act (FOIA) request, the California Reinvestment Coalition, a nonprofit, determined that as of December 2014, the FDIC had already paid over $1 billion to OneWest Bank under the shared loss agreements it secured from the FDIC when it purchased IndyMac and La Jolla Banks, and that the FDIC expected it would pay another $1.4 billion.

According to the New York Daily News, OneWest Bank foreclosed on the homes of thousands of people. According to the Wall Street Journal, OneWest Bank started foreclosure proceedings on 137,000 homeowners.

In enforcing its rights under the loans purchased from IndyMac, OneWest Bank took a much more aggressive approach to foreclosing on properties.

On November 25, 2009, Judge Spinner in Long Island, New York penalized OneWest for their “harsh, repugnant, shocking and repulsive” actions in trying to work out a distressed mortgage, by canceling the debt in favor of the borrower. A year after the New York Judge Spinner wiped away the debt, an appellate panel ruled that the judge had no right to do it. While Judge Spinner ruled that the bank's practices warranted him erasing the homeowners' debt, the appellate judges found that he had no authority to render such a judgment—and did not give the bank fair notice that such consequences were even on the table. After the ruling, in a previously unreported twist, senior OneWest executives reviewing the bank's past-due mortgages came across a delinquent loan made to the judge, a person familiar with the matter said. The bank asked the judge to recuse himself. He did. Judge Spinner said Wednesday that while he fell behind on his mortgage, this had no bearing on his decision in the Horoskis’ case. After Judge Spinner recused himself, a higher court overturned his decision canceling the Horoskis’ loan. The Horoskis’ home was foreclosed on in 2012 and later sold by the bank. OneWest, now owned by CIT Group Inc., is still trying to get more than $400,000 from Mrs. Yano-Horoski, she said.

On December 8, 2009, OneWest worked with the Hennepin County, Minnesota Sheriff's department to change the locks on a distressed home despite stating in a Nov. 25 e-mail that they were rescinding both the foreclosure and the sheriffs sale. OneWest Bank said, "You expressed concern that … you and your mother will be evicted from the property. Rest assured, that will not take place …". Changing the locks was done without any court action which bypasses acknowledged and mandated Due Process on home foreclosures in Minnesota.

OneWest Bank stopped originating reverse mortgages which was prior to CIT's acquisition of the bank. But, OneWest continued servicing its portfolio of reverse mortgages, and similar to regular mortgages, it was criticized by attorneys for a number of abusive foreclosure practices, such as the story of Ossie Lofton, a 90-year-old woman who OneWest tried to foreclose on over a 27 cents mistake. In May 2017, CIT agreed to pay $89 million in settlement claims related to its reverse mortgage program. According to the United States Department of Justice, "The United States alleged that Financial Freedom sought to obtain insurance payments for interest from FHA despite failing to properly disclose on the insurance claim forms it filed with the agency that the mortgagee was not eligible for such interest payments because it had failed to meet various deadlines relating to appraisal of the property, submission of claims to HUD, and pursuit of foreclosure proceedings. As a result, from March 31, 2011 to August 31, 2016, the mortgagees on the relevant reverse mortgage loans serviced by Financial Freedom allegedly obtained additional interest that they were not entitled to receive."

In July 2014, OneWest Bank and CIT Group announced a merger. CIT Group had accepted $2.3 billion in TARP funding that it never repaid because it declared bankruptcy. Nonprofits throughout the state very quickly raised concerns about the merger, citing the damage caused by the approximately 36,000 foreclosures conducted by OneWest in California, the bank's weak record in small business lending, the bank's weak community reinvestment act record, and concerns about possible redlining by the bank. On February 2, 2015, Daily Kos and the California Reinvestment Coalition visited the San Francisco Federal Reserve and delivered more than 15,000 petitions signed by people who opposed the merger. A picture of those petitions being delivered was included in a book by Al Gore. Bank regulators announced on February 6, 2015, that they would hold a public hearing about the proposed merger.

On August 3, 2015, CIT Group acquired OneWest Bank, N.A.

On June 4, 2018, the company sold Financial Freedom, the unit that was responsible for servicing reverse mortgages. The transaction included the sale of mortgage servicing rights and $879 million of reverse mortgage whole loans and other real estate owned assets.

In January 2022, CIT was acquired by First Citizens BancShares.

References

External links
 

Banks based in California
American companies established in 2009
Banks established in 2009
2015 mergers and acquisitions
Mortgage lenders of the United States
Companies based in Pasadena, California
2009 establishments in California